Aucamville is a commune in the Haute-Garonne department in southwestern France.

Population

International relations 
Aucamville is twinned with Fossalta di Portogruaro in Italy since 1990.

See also
Communes of the Haute-Garonne department

References

Communes of Haute-Garonne